"Say Cheese (Smile Please)" is a song by British bubblegum pop group Fast Food Rockers, released as a single on 6 October 2003 in the United Kingdom. The single debuted and peaked at number 10 on the UK Singles Chart.

Track listings
UK CD1
 "Say Cheese" (Parmesan Pop mix) – 3:40
 "Say Cheese" (Mag-C "Mozarella" club mix) – 5:56
 "Say Cheese" (Sing-A-Long-A-Cheese) – 3:40
 "Say Cheese" (video)

UK CD2
 "Say Cheese" (Parmesan Pop mix) – 3:40
 "Say Cheese" (LMC extended 'Fondue' remix) – 5:59
 "Stompin'" – 3:45

UK cassette single
 "Say Cheese" (Parmesan Pop mix) – 3:40
 "Say Cheese" (Sing-A-Long-A-Cheese) – 3:40

Charts

References

2003 singles
2003 songs
Fast Food Rockers songs
Songs written by Mike Stock (musician)